"He Wasn't" is a song by Canadian singer-songwriter Avril Lavigne, released as the fourth and final single from her second studio album, Under My Skin (2004). The song was written and produced by Lavigne and Chantal Kreviazuk. It was not released in the United States; instead, "Fall to Pieces" was released. "He Wasn't" was issued in Australia, Europe, and the United Kingdom and received airplay on Canadian radio. AllMusic highlighted the song as one of the most significant post-grunge songs of all time.

Song meaning
"He Wasn't" is about an unsuccessful relationship between Lavigne and a man who appears to be treating her badly, such as not even opening the door to her. The song is a fast and up-beat take on the boyfriend "not being good enough" as opposed to Lavigne's slower paced songs from Under My Skin on the same matter. On a documentary of the making of the "My Happy Ending" music video, "He Wasn't" plays in the background and Lavigne jokes, "'He wasn't what I wanted'...is that a theme on my record?". Chantal Kreviazuk described the song as "a super-fun, punk, screw-you-to-boys song".

Critical reception
"He Wasn't" was criticized for the shallowness of the lyrics. Sal Cinquemani of Slant magazine described the song as a "crappy faux-punk tune", mostly because of the lyrical content. David Browne of Entertainment Weekly described the song as a "bratty kiss-off" and labelled it "boardroom-approved mall punk" noting that it sounded similar to songs on Lavigne's first album, Let Go.

However, "He Wasn't" has also been praised for its loud, catchy nature; Stephen Thomas Erlewine of AllMusic describes the song as "the fastest, loudest, catchiest, and best song here, and the one closest to the spirit and sound of Let Go". He also highlighted the song as a 'track pick' in a review of the album, Under My Skin. Rolling Stone was positive "The album's best song, a raucous three-minute sprint called "He Wasn't," has a pretty vacant opening line ("There's not much going on today/I'm really bored") and a simple yet ambiguous chorus: "He wouldn't even open up the door/He never made me feel like I was special." but "The words are full of contempt and self-pity, but she sings them like she doesn't really care." Yahoo Music! wrote: ""He Wasn't" maintains this theme (broken relationship) with a dashing, Clash-style chorus that chastises this young man for not opening doors. Jeez, young women these days - one minute they're wearing stack-heeled DMs and fairy queen ra-ra skirts and the next they give you hell for not acting like your dad."

Accolades

Commercial performance
In the United Kingdom, "He Wasn't" debuted at number 23 and spent four weeks on the chart. In Australia, it debuted at number 25 and spent six weeks on the chart.

Music video

Background
The music video was directed by American duo the Malloys in New York on December 13, 2004. The production duo previously worked on the music video for Lavigne's "Complicated" (2002). Members of Lavigne's backing band, including Evan Taubenfeld, are featured in the music video.

During the shooting of the music video when the pink slime came out, Lavigne tells that days later her hair was still pink and she needed to redye it because during the next days she was scheduled to have a photoshoot with Cosmopolitan and her hair was looking really messy and all pink.

Synopsis
The video features Lavigne singing and her band playing instruments in the background. There are scenes where she dances around wearing white gloves, a pink skirt, and holding a magic wand (she is portraying a fairy), and other scenes where she is wearing devil horns on her head (she is portraying the devil). It turns out that Lavigne and her band are at a video shoot, and later get into a food fight, much to the dismay of the directors - who are played by Lavigne and the band, all dressed up in wigs and suits. Avril then rebels and smashes her guitar into the camera lens, and then into the paper wall, where pink paint splashes out. The video ends with the band dancing and Lavigne doing the splits.

Live performances
The song was performed during the Bonez Tour (2004-2005) as the opening song of the concert tour. "He Wasn't" has subsequently been included on Lavigne's the Best Damn World Tour (2008), Black Star Tour (2011-2012), the Avril Lavigne Tour (2013-2014), and Head Above Water Tour (2019).

Track listings and formats
 UK CD
 "He Wasn't" – 2:59
 "He Wasn't" (live version) – 3:16
 "He Wasn't" (video) 
 "Video Diary"

 Australian CD
 "He Wasn't" – 2:59
 "He Wasn't" (live full band performance) – 3:13
 "He Wasn't" (live acoustic version) – 3:16
 "He Wasn't" (video)

 French CD
 "He Wasn't" – 2:59
 "He Wasn't" (live acoustic version) – 3:16

Credits and personnel
Credits and personnel are adapted from the "He Wasn't" CD single liner notes.
 Avril Lavigne – writer, lead vocals
 Chantal Kreviazuk – writer
 Raine Maida – producer
 Brian Garcia – recording at Whitecoat Sound (Malibu) and The Boat (Los Angeles), digital editing, percussion
 Danny Kalb – recording assistant
 Bob Boyd – recording assistant
 Jason Lader – digital editing
 Tom Lord-Alge – mixing
 Femio Hernandez – mixing assistant
 Phil X – guitar
 Mike Elizondo – bass
 Bill Lefler – drums

Charts

Release history

References

2004 songs
2005 singles
Arista Records singles
Avril Lavigne songs
Music videos directed by The Malloys
RCA Records singles
Songs written by Avril Lavigne
Songs written by Chantal Kreviazuk
Sony BMG singles